Stephanie Victoria Allen (born 14 December 1991), better known by her stage name Stefflon Don, is a British rapper and singer. She rose to fame after her 2017 single "Hurtin' Me" featuring French Montana peaked at number 7 on UK Singles Chart. In 2016, Allen released her debut mixtape Real Ting followed by another mixtape, Secure, in 2018.

Early life and education
Stefflon Don was born in Birmingham, England, and is of Jamaican descent. She has seven siblings, one of them being rapper Dutchavelli. When she was five years old, her family moved to Rotterdam, Netherlands. As a result, Allen is fluent in Dutch. Allen has been singing and writing music since primary school. At the age of nine, she recorded a "Hard Knock Life" hook for rapper U-Niq. The song was never released, but she was surprised to hear her voice on the playback. At the age of 14, she returned to Britain to study at a London school. She worked as a cake decorator and hairdresser before her career in music.

Career

2015–2017: Career beginnings and Real Ting 
Don first surfaced in 2015 by releasing a cover of Wretch 32's "6 Words" and went on to be featured on tracks such as Lethal Bizzle's "Wobble", Sneakbo's "Work" remix, Angel's Hop On and KSI's 2016 song "Touch Down", which appears on the soundtrack of the 2017 film Baywatch. "Fashion Killa (Papapapa)" by Mason, released 16 August 2016, was written by Stefflon Don and Mason (Iason Chronis). Don made her first appearance on an American song with the track "London" by singer Jeremih, and was later featured on Lil Yachty's "Better" from the album Teenage Emotions. On 16 December 2016, Don released her first mixtape titled Real Ting.

In the spring of 2016, Don was signed to 54 London a subsidiary of Universal Music Group that was created just for her. A few months later, she was featured on the dancehall track "Instruction" with Jax Jones and Demi Lovato. The trio performed the song live for the first time in June 2018 at the Summertime Ball.

On 15 August 2017, she released the lead single "Hurtin' Me" with French Montana from her debut EP titled Hurtin' Me – The EP, which reached number 7 on the UK Singles Chart. The EP was later released on 12 January 2018.

On 29 November, Don took home the award for Best Female at the 2017 MOBO Awards.

2018–2020: Secure 
In March 2018, Don appeared on the front cover of the final print edition in the 66-year run of NME.

In March 2018, Don was featured on the remix for American singer Halsey's "Alone" along with American rapper Big Sean. The song peaked at number 66 on the Billboard Hot 100, becoming her first entry on the chart and also earned Don her first Dance Club Songs number one. The music video was released on 6 April 2018.

In March 2019, Don was featured on the Mariah Carey remix for the song "A No No" from her 2018 album Caution.

In June 2018, Don was included in the XXL Freshman Class.
On 17 August 2018, Don released her second mixtape Secure.

In March 2019, she collaborated with Wiley on the song "Boasty".

In July 2019, her vocals were featured on XXXTentacion's posthumous track "Royalty".

2021–present 
On 25 August 2021, Don was featured on a Kiss My (Uh Oh) Girl Power Remix along with Anne-Marie, Little Mix, Raye and Becky Hill.

On 4 June 2022, she participated in the Platinum Party at the Palace, performing with Jax Jones and Nandi Bushell, to mark the Platinum Jubilee of Elizabeth II.

Personal life 
She gave birth to her first child, a son named Jaylen, at 17 years old.

She is the sister of rapper Dutchavelli.

In September 2019, she held a giveaway on Twitter after reaching a billion streams as an artist. British artist Shocka reached out to her stating that he was in Nigeria for cancer treatment for his mother. She decided to gift the money for his mother's treatment.

Allen dated Nigerian singer Burna Boy from 2018 to 2022.

Discography

Awards and nominations

References 

1991 births
Black British women rappers
British hip hop singers
English women rappers
English people of Jamaican descent
Living people
Motown artists
Rappers from Birmingham, West Midlands
Polydor Records artists
Quality Control artists
British women hip hop musicians